Hoseynabad-e Kalagushi (also Romanized as Ḩoseynābād-e Kalāgūshī; also known as Ḩoseynābād) is a village in Dehshir Rural District, in the Central District of Taft County, Yazd Province, Iran. At the 2006 census, its population was 23, in 8 families.

References 

Populated places in Taft County